Argyroxiphium virescens was a species of flowering plant in the family Asteraceae that was last seen in 1945. It was found only in the Hawaiian Islands where it was endemic to the eastern part of Maui. Its natural habitats were subtropical or tropical moist montane forests and subtropical or tropical high-altitude shrubland. It is officially declared extinct, but in 1989 plants were discovered that appear to be hybrids between it and the Haleakalā silversword.

References

virescens
Endemic flora of Hawaii
Extinct flora of Hawaii
Plant extinctions since 1500
Taxonomy articles created by Polbot